Max Jimmy Dean (born 21 February 2004) is an English professional footballer who plays for Milton Keynes Dons, as a striker.

Career
Dean began his career with Leeds United, signing his first professional contract with the club in March 2021.

Dean signed for Milton Keynes Dons in January 2023. He made his professional debut for MK Dons on 21 January 2023 as a second-half substitute in the 2-1 League One win against Forest Green Rovers. Dean scored his first goal for MK Dons in the League One 2-0 win against Bristol Rovers on 4 February 2023.

References

2004 births
Living people
English footballers
Leeds United F.C. players
Milton Keynes Dons F.C. players
English Football League players
Association football forwards